American singer Mariah Carey has released fifteen studio albums, two soundtrack albums, eight compilation albums, four extended plays, and one remix album. Carey is one of the best-selling music artists of all-time, having sold over 220 million records globally. She was presented with the Millennium Award at the 2000 World Music Awards for becoming the best-selling female artist of the millennium. According to the RIAA, she is the highest-certified female artist and tenth overall recording artist with shipments of 74 million albums in the US. She is also ranked as the best-selling female artist of the US Nielsen SoundScan era (1991–present) with album sales of 55.5 million.

Carey released her self-titled debut album in June 1990; it was certified nine-time platinum by the Recording Industry Association of America (RIAA), denoting shipments of nine million copies in the United States. Her second album, Emotions, was released a year later and sold eight million copies worldwide. In 1993, Carey released her most successful studio album to date, Music Box, which was certified Diamond in the United States and topped the charts in many countries around the world. Music Box is one of the best-selling albums of all time, with over 28 million copies sold. Carey's her first holiday album and fourth overall studio effort, Merry Christmas, followed in 1994. After Carey's success in Asia with Merry Christmas, Billboard estimated Carey as the all-time best-selling international artist in Japan. The singer's fifth studio album Daydream was released in 1995 and became her second Diamond certified album by the RIAA, with worldwide sales of 20 million copies.

Carey's sixth studio album Butterfly, and the compilation album, #1's, were both certified five-time platinum in the US; the latter remains the best-selling album in Japan by a non-Asian artist, selling 3.25 million copies. While the singer's seventh studio effort Rainbow (1999) received triple platinum certification from RIAA, it was her first album since Merry Christmas to not reach number one in the US. Carey parted from Columbia/Sony Music in 2001 and signed a contract with EMI's Virgin Records worth a reported US$100 million, the largest record contract ever signed. She released her next album, Glitter, which was the soundtrack to the film of same name. The album suffered from poor publicity and became a commercial failure, primarily due to setbacks and delays surrounding its release; ultimately, the album and film would be released on September 11, 2001, a tragic day on which music and movies would be the least of America's concerns. However, in 2018, Mariah Carey fans around the world successfully executed an internet campaign called #JusticeForGlitter; the fan-created petition's goal was to have as many people purchase the album, digitally, as possible. Seventeen years after the failed release of Glitter, and coming from relative obscurity, the album had suddenly reached the #1 spot on the iTunes albums chart, primarily due to the fans' promotions.

Carey signed a new deal in 2002 with Island Records and released her ninth studio album Charmbracelet, which also fell short of Carey's earlier success. The singer then took a three-year break to record new material and introduced a hip-hop inspired album,  The Emancipation of Mimi, which became the best-selling album of 2005 in the US. It was certified six-time platinum by the RIAA, sold 10 million copies worldwide. In 2008, Carey released her tenth studio album, E=MC², which sold over 2.5 million copies worldwide. Her subsequent release, Memoirs of an Imperfect Angel (2009), managed sales of two million units while her second holiday album Merry Christmas II You (2010) shipped over 500,000 copies in the United States. The singer's fourteenth effort, Me. I Am Mariah... The Elusive Chanteuse, became the lowest selling release of her career.

After the poor reception from her fourteenth album, Carey eventually went on to secure a multi-album record deal with Epic in January 2015, a subsidiary of Sony Music Entertainment. She subsequently came out with her sixth compilation album, #1 to Infinity, and a residency deal to perform at The Colosseum at the Caesars Palace hotel in Las Vegas. Her fifteenth studio album, Caution, was released in November 2018 under Epic, and was given much higher praise than her most recent works at the time. In 2019, Carey released a deluxe version of her first Christmas album featuring an extra disc of remixes, live performances and multiple tracks from her second Christmas album. In mid-2020, to celebrate the 30th anniversary of Carey's debut album, Carey released a compilation album, entitled The Rarities, which featured unreleased songs, B-sides, demos and live performances. A few months later, Carey announced a Christmas special with an accompanying soundtrack, Mariah Carey's Magical Christmas Special. The album featured rerecordings of Carey's Christmas discography along with a variety of musical guests, including Ariana Grande, Snoop Dogg among others.

Studio albums

Soundtrack albums

Compilation albums

Remix albums

Extended plays

Box sets

See also
 Mariah Carey singles discography
 List of best-selling music artists
 List of best-selling Western artists in Japan
 List of Billboard Hot 100 chart achievements and milestones
 List of best-selling albums
 List of best-selling albums by women
 List of best-selling albums of the 21st century
 List of best-selling albums in Australia
 List of best-selling albums in Belgium
 List of best-selling albums in Japan
 List of best-selling albums in the United States

Notes

References

External links

Discography
Pop music discographies
Rhythm and blues discographies
Discographies of American artists
Soul music discographies